Roadie is a 2011 American comedy film directed by Michael Cuesta and written by Gerald Cuesta and Michael Cuesta. The film stars Ron Eldard, Jill Hennessy, Bobby Cannavale, Lois Smith, David Margulies and Catherine Wolf. The film was released on January 6, 2012, by Magnolia Pictures.

Cast
Ron Eldard as Jimmy
Jill Hennessy as Nikki
Bobby Cannavale as Randy Stevens
Lois Smith as Mom
David Margulies as Don Muller
Catherine Wolf as Marilyn Muller
Suzette Gunn as Lizette

Release
The film premiered at the Tribeca Film Festival on April 23, 2011. The film was released on January 6, 2012, by Magnolia Pictures.

References

External links
 

2011 films
2011 comedy films
American comedy films
Films directed by Michael Cuesta
2010s English-language films
2010s American films